Gianluca Frontino (born 29 November 1989) is a Swiss football midfielder who currently plays for and is the manager of FC Diessenhofen.

Career
At the age of only 29, Frontino was appointed as a playing manager for FC Diessenhofen from the 2019/20 season.

References

External links
 Football.ch profile
 Switzerland U-19 squad list
 

1989 births
Living people
Swiss men's footballers
Switzerland youth international footballers
U.S. Lecce players
Grasshopper Club Zürich players
FC Schaffhausen players
FC Thun players
FC Winterthur players
FC Aarau players
Swiss Super League players
Swiss Challenge League players
Swiss expatriate footballers
Expatriate footballers in Italy
Association football midfielders